Inga Finau (born 21 August 1994) is a New Zealand rugby union player who currently plays as a second five-eighth for  in New Zealand's domestic Mitre 10 Cup.

Early career

After attending high school at the Dilworth School in his native Auckland, Finau headed south to Christchurch to study sports coaching at the University of Canterbury.   There, he attended the  Academy and played club rugby with the Christchurch Rugby Club.

Senior career

Impressive form at club level saw Finau named in the Canterbury Mitre 10 Cup squad for the first time in 2016.   He made 7 appearances of which 6 came from the replacements bench and scored 1 try as the Cantabrians lifted the Premiership title, their 8th in 9 seasons.

International

Finau was a member of the New Zealand Under 20 team which competed in the 2014 IRB Junior World Championship in his home country.   He made 3 appearances and didn't score any tries.

References

1994 births
Living people
New Zealand rugby union players
Rugby union centres
Canterbury rugby union players
Rugby union players from Auckland
People educated at Dilworth School
Auckland rugby union players
Bay of Plenty rugby union players
Crusaders (rugby union) players
Blues (Super Rugby) players
Chiefs (rugby union) players